Tricolia tingitana is a species of a small sea snail, a marine gastropod mollusk in the family Phasianellidae.

Description
The height of the shell reaches 1.7 mm.

Distribution
This species occurs in the Eastern Atlantic Ocean and in the Mediterranean Sea.

References

 Gofas S. (1982). The genus Tricolia in the Eastern Atlantic and the Mediterranean. Journal of Molluscan Studies 48: 182-213

External links

External links
 Gofas, S.; Le Renard, J.; Bouchet, P. (2001). Mollusca. in: Costello, M.J. et al. (eds), European Register of Marine Species: a check-list of the marine species in Europe and a bibliography of guides to their identification. Patrimoines Naturels. 50: 180-213

Phasianellidae
Gastropods described in 1982